Mathias Wenda was the Commander in Chief of the West Papua Revolutionary Army (WPRA). He has been active in West Papua independence movement since his early age in his village, Pyramid, West Papua. In 1977, became the leader of the fight against the Indonesian occupation. He fled to Papua New Guinea upon the surrender of most of the villagers in 1980.

Wenda was appointed by Hendrik Jacob Prai as the operational commander during the operations by the PEMKA factions within the armed wing of the OPM after the Prai's decision to separate from Victoria (Marvic) faction.

See also
West Papua Revolutionary Army

References

West Papuan independence activists
Living people
Year of birth missing (living people)